Waskatenau is a village in central Alberta, Canada. Waskatenau is a Cree word meaning "opening in the bank" in reference to the clef in the nearby ridge through which the Waskatenau Creek flows. It is pronounced WAS-ET-NA, with a silent "k."

Demographics 

In the 2016 Census of Population conducted by Statistics Canada, the Village of Waskatenau recorded a population of 186 living in 99 of its 129 total private dwellings, a  change from its 2011 population of 255.

Home Run For Life softball marathons 
Waskatenau is known for its repeated efforts to set a world record for the longest continuous game of softball.  The town held three such softball marathons, known as the "Home Run For Life", as fundraisers for the Cross Cancer Institute and Stollery Children's Hospital in Edmonton.  In late June 2005, the first marathon went for 60 hours and 4 minutes and raised $75,000, unofficially holding the world record for less than 1 day before a team in Quebec broke it.  Waskatenau tried again in 2007, and played for 108 hours and 3 minutes from June 27 to July 1, raising over $91,000.  However, the Guinness Book of World Records disallowed the record for technical reasons.  Finally, in 2009, Home Run For Life III successfully set the official, Guinness-approved record for the "longest game of softball", playing 115 hours and 3 minutes from June 30 to July 5, and raising more than $110,000.

History 
The 1880s name for the area was Wah-Sat-now after the nearby cleft as mentioned above. The Wah-Sat-Now (Cree) band in residence there in the 1880s later moved to the Saddle Lake reserve.

The new spelling Waskatenau was in common use by 1920. About that time a CNR line was built from Edmonton to St. Paul. Waskatenau was the station built between Radway and Warspite.

The Village of Waskatenau was incorporated on May 19, 1932.

See also 
List of communities in Alberta
List of villages in Alberta

References

External links 

1932 establishments in Alberta
Villages in Alberta